Crazy Frog Presents More Crazy Hits is the second album from Crazy Frog, released in the UK on June 27, 2006, and in Canada on July 24. "We Are the Champions (Ding a Dang Dong)" was released as the first single on June 6.

The European re-edition entitled "The Ultimate Edition" was released in December 2006 and featured few new songs (from the US edition), and also the single version of "Crazy Frog in the House (Knight Rider)" and "Last Christmas 2006". That re-edition included also the biggest hits from the previous album - "Axel F" and "Popcorn".

Track listings 
 "Intro (Go Froggy Go)"
 "We Are the Champions (Ding a Dang Dong)"
 "Crazy Frog in the House (Knight Rider)"
 "I'm Too Sexy" featuring Marcus Hutton on Synth
 "Hey Baby"
 "Crazy Jodeling"
 "The Final Countdown"
 "I Will Survive"
 "Nellie the Elephant"
 "Ice Ice Baby"
 "Kiss Him Goodbye (Na Na Na, Hey Hey)"
 "Copa Banana"
 "Go Froggy Go" featuring Archie Merrington on the Electric Triangle
 "Rock Steady"
 "Super Crazy Sounds"
 "Cotton Eyed Joe" (Deluxe Edition Bonus Track)
 "Blue (Da Ba Dee)"(Deluxe Edition Bonus Track)
 "Living on Video" (Deluxe Edition Bonus Track)
 "Everytime We Touch" (Deluxe Edition Bonus Track)
 "Axel F" (Deluxe Edition Bonus Track) 
 "Last Christmas" (Deluxe Edition Bonus Track)
 "Popcorn" (Deluxe Edition Bonus Track)
 "In the 80's (Deluxe Edition Bonus Track)"
 "Axel F" (Video)
 "Popcorn" (Video)
 "We Are The Champions (Ding A Dang Dong)" (Video)
 "Axel F" (New Version) (Video) (Deluxe Edition Bonus Track)
 "Crazy Frog In The House" (Knight Rider) (Video) (Deluxe Edition Bonus Track)
 "Last Christmas" (Video) (Deluxe Edition Bonus Track)
 "Photo Gallery"

Certifications

Charts

References

External links 
 "More Crazy Hits" official site
 Gut Records press release

Crazy Frog albums
2006 albums
Ministry of Sound albums